Club de Rugby Atlético Portuense is a Spanish rugby union club.

The club began as the rugby section of the Club Atlético Portuense in 1971, joining the junior and senior leagues in 1972. In 1982 the rugby section became an independent club and has been known as Club de Rugby Atlético Portuense since.  Currently the 1st team competes in the División de Honor B competition, the second-highest level of Spanish club rugby.

The club is based in the town of El Puerto de Santa Maria in Andalucia, Spain. CR Atlético Portuense play in yellow and green colours.

Home games are played at the municipal sports centre "Polideportivo La Puntilla" and the club also has its own private clubhouse called La Bodeguita del Club de Rugby, which is inside a restored sherry bodega and situated at Calle La Palma, 23.

Season by season

3 seasons in División de Honor
10 seasons in División de Honor B

See also
Rugby union in Spain

External links
Official website

Spanish rugby union teams
Sports teams in Andalusia
Rugby clubs established in 1982
1982 establishments in Spain
El Puerto de Santa María